Henry Brandt (20 August 1828 – 31 March 1898) was an English first-class cricketer and clergyman.

The son of Robert Brandt, he was born at Salford in August 1828. He was educated at Rugby School, before going up to Trinity College, Cambridge. While studying at Trinity, he took part in The Boat Race of 1852, in addition to gaining a rowing blue. After leaving Cambridge, Brandt was ordained in the Church of England and served as the canon of St Paul's, Bedford from 1852–54. In 1854, he made a single appearance in first-class cricket for Manchester against Sheffield at the Botanical Gardens, Manchester. Batting twice in the match, he was dismissed for 13 runs in Manchester's first-innings by John Berry, while in their second-innings he was dismissed 7 runs by E. B. Kaye. He was a priest at Ely in 1854, before serving as the rector of Burrough on the Hill, Leicestershire from 1855–73 and from 1873–83, he was the vicar of Elworth, Cheshire. Brandt later retired to Cockington in Devon, where he died in March 1898.

Notes and references

External links

1828 births
1898 deaths
People from Salford
People educated at Rugby School
Alumni of Trinity College, Cambridge
19th-century English Anglican priests
English cricketers
Manchester Cricket Club cricketers